The 2015 FST Grupa Brokerska Toruń FIM Speedway Grand Prix of Poland was the 11th race of the 2015 Speedway Grand Prix season. It took place on October 3 at the MotoArena in Toruń, Poland.

Riders 
First reserve Peter Kildemand replaced Jarosław Hampel, who had injured himself during the 2015 Speedway World Cup. The Speedway Grand Prix Commission also nominated Paweł Przedpełski as the wild card, and Piotr Pawlicki Jr. and Bartosz Zmarzlik both as Track Reserves. However, Przedepełski did not race with Pawlicki Jr. taking all five of his rides in the main event.

Results 
The Grand Prix was won by Nicki Pedersen, who beat Jason Doyle, Maciej Janowski and Niels-Kristian Iversen in the final. Doyle had initially top scored during the heats, beating Pedersen on countback after both riders had scored 13 points. However, Pedersen had the edge in the deciding race and claimed his third Grand Prix win of the season. Overall, Tai Woffinden was crowned world champion with one round remaining. He failed to reach the semi-finals, however Greg Hancock was eliminated in the semi-finals. This maintained Woffinden's now unassailable 25-point lead at the top of the standings.

Heat details

The intermediate classification

References

See also 
 motorcycle speedway

2015 Speedway Grand Prix
2015 in Polish speedway